"Blood Red and Goin' Down" is a song written by Curly Putman, and recorded by American country music artist Tanya Tucker.  It was released in June 1973 as the second single from Tucker's album What's Your Mama's Name.  The single was Tucker's second number one on the country chart and would stay at number one for a single week and spend a total of twelve weeks on the chart.

Content
The song is about an adolescent girl, who accompanies her father to a barroom where her mother and her mother's lover are drinking, and witnesses as her father murders the pair.

Chart performance

References

1973 singles
1973 songs
Tanya Tucker songs
Songs written by Curly Putman
Song recordings produced by Billy Sherrill
Columbia Records singles